Phineas and Ferb is an American animated musical-comedy television series created by Dan Povenmire and Jeff "Swampy" Marsh which aired on Disney Channel and Disney XD for four seasons. Produced by Disney Television Animation, the series was originally broadcast as a one-episode preview on August 17, 2007, following the premiere of High School Musical 2, and again previewed on September 28, 2007; the series officially premiered on February 1, 2008, on Disney Channel, and ran until June 12, 2015.

The program follows Phineas Flynn and his stepbrother Ferb Fletcher, who are between eight and ten years old, during summer vacation. Every day, the boys embark on a grand new project, which is usually unrealistic in scale given the protagonists' ages (and are sometimes physically impossible). This annoys their controlling older sister Candace, who frequently tries to reveal their shenanigans to her and Phineas' mother, Linda Flynn-Fletcher, and less frequently to Ferb's father, Lawrence Fletcher. The series follows a standard plot system; running gags occur in every episode, and the subplot almost always features Phineas and Ferb's pet platypus Perry working as a spy named "Agent P" for the O.W.C.A. (Organization Without a Cool Acronym) to defeat the latest scheme of Dr. Heinz Doofenshmirtz, a mad scientist driven largely by a need to assert his evilness who is often defeated by his own ineptitude. The two plots intersect at the end to erase all traces of the boys' project just before Candace can show it to their mother, which usually leaves Candace very frustrated.

Povenmire and Marsh had previously worked together on Fox's The Simpsons and Nickelodeon's Rocko's Modern Life. The creators also voice two of the main B-plot characters, Dr. Doofenshmirtz and Major Monogram. Phineas and Ferb was conceived after Povenmire sketched a triangular boy – the prototype for Phineas – in a restaurant. Povenmire and Marsh developed the series concept together and pitched it to networks for 16 years before securing a run on Disney Channel. On January 13, 2023, Disney Branded Television announced at the Television Critics Association that the show would be revived with two seasons, containing a combined total of 40 episodes.

Premise
The show follows the adventures of stepbrothers Phineas Flynn and Ferb Fletcher, who live in the fictional city of Danville in an unspecified tri-state area, as they seek ways to occupy their time during their summer vacation. Often these adventures involve elaborate, life-sized and ostensibly dangerous construction projects. Phineas' older sister Candace Flynn has two obsessions: exposing Phineas and Ferb's schemes and ideas, and winning the attention of a boy named Jeremy. Meanwhile, the boys' pet platypus Perry acts as a secret agent for an all-animal government organization called the O.W.C.A. ("Organization Without a Cool Acronym"), fighting Dr. Heinz Doofenshmirtz.

Characters

The series' main characters live in a blended family, a premise that the creators considered underused in children's programming and that reflected Marsh's own upbringing. Marsh considers explaining the family background "not important to the kids' lives. They are a great blended family and that's all we need to know." The choice of a platypus as the boys' pet was similarly inspired by media underuse, as well as to exploit the animal's striking appearance. Povenmire and Marsh wanted to select an uncommon species, an animal that kids could not "pick out at a pet store and beg [their parents] for." The platypus also gives them freedom to "make stuff up" since "no one knows very much about them." Choosing a platypus also allowed them to own that "mental real estate," so that if someone thinks of the word "platypus," they will associate it with Agent P, just as an ogre is now commonly associated with Shrek. Marsh called the characters "cool, edgy and clever without ... being mean-spirited." Animation director Rob Hughes is said to have noted that "in all the other shows every character is either stupid or a jerk, but there are no stupid characters or jerks in this one."

Development

Early inspirations

Dan Povenmire attributes the show's genesis to his childhood in Mobile, Alabama, where his mother told him to never waste a day of summer. To occupy himself, Povenmire undertook projects such as hole-digging and home movie-making. Povenmire recalled, "My mom let me drape black material all the way across one end of our living room to use as a space field. I would hang little models of spaceships for these little movies I made with a Super 8 camera." He was an artistic prodigy and displayed his very detailed drawings at art shows.

Marsh was raised in a large, blended family. As with Povenmire, Marsh spent his summers exploring and taking part in various activities to have fun.

Conception

While attending the University of Southern California, Povenmire started a daily comic strip called Life Is a Fish, and received money from the sale of its related merchandise. He eventually dropped out and started drawing people on street corners to make a living, until he was finally called by Tommy Chong to work on a short bit of animation in the film Far Out Man. Povenmire began to take up animation professionally, working on shows such as Teenage Mutant Ninja Turtles. Marsh had become a vice president of sales and marketing for a computer company until he "freaked out" and decided to quit. His friend helped him put together a portfolio and enter the animation business.

Povenmire and Marsh started working across from each other as layout artists on The Simpsons. The two bonded over mutual tastes in humor and music, becoming fast friends. They continued their working relationship as a writing team on the Nickelodeon series Rocko's Modern Life, where they conceived the idea for their own series. While eating dinner at a Wild Thyme restaurant in South Pasadena, Povenmire drew a quick sketch of a "triangle kid" on butcher paper. He tore it out and called Marsh that night to report, "Hey, I think we have our show."

The triangle doodle sparked rapid development of characters and designs. Povenmire decided that his sketch "looked like a Phineas," and named Ferb after a friend who "owns more tools than anyone in the world." The creators based their character designs on angular shapes in homage to MGM/Warner Bros. animator/director Tex Avery, adding geometric shapes to the backgrounds for continuity.

Pitching and pickup

The writing duo's early attempts to pitch the show failed and, though they remained committed to the concept, Povenmire and Marsh began to drift apart after their work on Rocko's. Marsh moved to London and worked on shows including Postman Pat and Bounty Hamster. Povenmire began working on the primetime Fox series Family Guy and the Nickelodeon series SpongeBob SquarePants, always carrying a Phineas and Ferb portfolio for convenient pitching to networks such as Cartoon Network and Fox Kids. The networks passed on the show, believing the series' premise was too complex to succeed.

Povenmire persisted and again pitched the series to Nickelodeon, where it was considered by high-level executives but rejected once more as overly complicated. Then, after 16 years of trying, Povenmire landed a pitch with Disney. The network did not immediately accept the show, but told Povenmire that it would keep the packet. Povenmire assumed that this had meant an end to negotiations, aware that the phrase usually "means they throw it in the trash later." Disney then surprised him by accepting. Said Povenmire, "Disney was the first to say, 'Let's see if you can do it in 11 minutes.' We did it in the pilot and they said, 'Let's see if you can do it for 26 episodes.

Povenmire was initially worried that his work on Family Guy (an adult show known for its lowbrow humor) would concern Disney, which markets its fare primarily to families. However, Disney Channel senior vice president of original series Adam Bonnett was a Family Guy fan who appreciated Povenmire's connection to the show and received his pitch well.

In 2006, after the Disney Channel had accepted the show, Povenmire and Marsh turned their attention to the company's overseas executives. Instead of penning a normal script, the two drew out storyboards and played them in a reel. Povenmire voiced over the reel with his dialogue and added sound effects. This novel approach secured the executives' support.

Production

Writing style

The show uses four main writers to devise story ideas according to "strict guidelines", such as that the boys' schemes never appear to be "magical." Stories are reviewed at weekly sessions on a Monday, then simultaneously scripted and storyboarded. A very rough design is built before the storyboard, featuring little more than suggested scenes and dialogue, is drafted; the writers then gather for a "play-by-play" walkthrough of the storyboard in front of the whole crew, whose reactions to the jokes are assessed before rewrites are made. The writers also include running gags in every episode, which are generally lines spoken by characters. Almost every episode is split into two 11-minute segments. Dan Povenmire admitted that the "a-plot" of each episode, the one following Phineas and Ferb's inventions, is not actually a plot, but instead the setting, with the actual plot being Candace, Perry and Dr. Doofenshmirtz's story, "The essence of story is that the characters are changed by what happens to them. Nothing ever changes the boys, they never learn anything, there's never any obstacles they have to overcome, everything just works out for them."

Much of the series' humor relies on running gags used in almost every episode, with slight variation. 
Certain aspects of the show's humor are aimed at adults, including its frequent pop-culture references. Co-creator Dan Povenmire, who had previously worked on Family Guy, sought to create a less raunchy show that would make similar use of comic timing, metahumor, humorous blank stares, wordplay and breaking the fourth wall. Povenmire describes the show as a combination of Family Guy and SpongeBob SquarePants. Co-creator Jeff "Swampy" Marsh has said that the show was not created exclusively for children; he simply did not exclude them as an audience.

Visual aspects and animation

Rough Draft Studios in South Korea, Wang Film Productions in Taiwan, Morning Sun Animation and Synergy Animation in Shanghai and Hong Ying Animation and Hong Guang Animation in Suzhou animate the series in 2D Animation using the software package Toon Boom. Povenmire undertakes the bulk of production direction, along with Zac Moncrief and Robert Hughes. The series adopts artistic features from animator Tex Avery, such as geometric shapes integrated into characters, objects, and backgrounds. Povenmire says of this inclusion, "There's a little bit of Tex Avery in there-he had that very graphic style [in his later cartoons]." Triangles are featured as an easter egg in the background of every episode, sometimes in trees or buildings.

Bright colors are also a prominent element of the animation. Marsh elaborates, "The idea at the end of the day was candy. One of the things that I think works so well is that the characters are so bright and candy-colored and our backgrounds are a much more realistic depiction of the world: the soft green of the grass, the natural woods for the fence. In order for all the stuff that they do to work, their world needs to be grounded in reality." The designers sought to keep their characters visually simple, so that kids "would easily be able to draw [them] themselves." Characters were also crafted to be recognizable from a distance, a technique that the creators say is based on Matt Groening's goal of making characters recognizable by silhouette.

Cast
Phineas and Ferb are voiced by Vincent Martella and Thomas Sangster, respectively. Sangster was one of many British actors cast, as Marsh lived in the United Kingdom for seven years and developed a fondness for the British. The rest of the cast includes Ashley Tisdale as their sister Candace; Bobby Gaylor as Buford van Stomm, who has a tendency to bully but is kept distracted by being included in the adventures; Maulik Pancholy as Baljeet Tjinder, a very intelligent boy who avoids being Buford's main victim by their participation in the adventures; Dee Bradley Baker as Perry the Platypus; Caroline Rhea as Linda Flynn-Fletcher, Phineas and Candace's mother and stepmother to Ferb; Richard O'Brien as Lawrence Fletcher, Ferb's father and Phineas and Candace's stepfather; Jack McBrayer as Irving, who admires Phineas and Ferb, and is the creator of the Phineas and Ferb fansite; Kelly Hu as Candace's best friend Stacy; Povenmire as Dr. Doofenshmirtz; Marsh as Major Monogram; Olivia Olson as Dr. Doofenshmirtz's daughter Vanessa; Tyler Mann as Carl, Major Monogram's goofy super genius intern; Alyson Stoner as neighbor Isabella Garcia-Shapiro, a sweet Mexican/Jewish girl with a crush on Phineas; Mitchel Musso as Jeremy, Candace's crush and later her boyfriend; and Madison Pettis as Adyson Sweetwater, a member of Isabella's Fireside Girls troop.

The show's casting organization is responsible for selecting most of the voice actors and actresses, choosing actors such as Martella and Musso for major roles based on perceived popularity with target demographics. Povenmire and Marsh select guest stars, casting people that they "really want to work with." They also solicit guest roles from actors whom they feel would lend an interesting presence to the show.

Guest stars have included pop-culture figures such as Damian Lewis, boxer Evander Holyfield, film stars Cloris Leachman and Ben Stiller and pop singer Kelly Clarkson. Povenmire and Marsh have also solicited Tim Curry and Barry Bostwick, stars of The Rocky Horror Picture Show, to make guest appearances, while Rocky Horror creator Richard O'Brien voices Lawrence Fletcher. Top Gear stars Jeremy Clarkson, Richard Hammond and James May guest-starred in a race-car themed episode as commentators. Other guest stars include Tina Fey, Seth MacFarlane, David Mitchell, Jaret Reddick, Clay Aiken, Chaka Khan and Kevin Smith.

Music
The series is known for its original songs that appear in almost every episode since the first-season "Flop Starz". Disney's executives particularly enjoyed the episode's song "Gitchee, Gitchee Goo" and requested that a song appear in each subsequent episode. The music earned the series a total of four Emmy nominations: in 2008 for the main title theme and for the song "I Ain't Got Rhythm" from the episode "Dude, We're Getting the Band Back Together", and in 2010 for the song "Come Home Perry" from the episode "Oh, There You Are, Perry" as well as one for its score.

Phineas and Ferb follows structural conventions that Povenmire and Marsh developed while writing Rocko's Modern Life, whereby each episode features "a song or a musical number, plus a big action/chase scene." Both creators had musical backgrounds, as Povenmire performed rock and roll in his college years and Marsh's grandfather was the bandleader Les Brown.

The series' songs span many genres, from 16th-century madrigals to Broadway show tunes. Each is written in an intensive session during episode production; a concept, score and lyrics are developed quickly. Together, Marsh and Povenmire can "write a song about almost anything" within one hour. After they finish writing their songs, Povenmire and Marsh sing them over the answering machine of series composer Danny Jacob on Friday nights. By the following Monday, the song is fully produced.

The title sequence song "Today Is Gonna Be a Great Day", performed by the American group Bowling for Soup, was nominated for an Emmy award in 2008. The creators originally wrote a slower number more in keeping with a "classic Disney song", but the network felt that changes were needed to especially appeal to children and commissioned the rock version that made the final cut.

A season two clip show, entitled "Phineas and Ferb's Musical Cliptastic Countdown", was broadcast in October 2009. The show focuses on the series' music, featuring a viewer-voted list of the top ten songs from the series. This clip show spawned a sequel, "Phineas and Ferb Musical Cliptastic Countdown Hosted by Kelly Osbourne", which aired on June 28, 2013. Osbourne hosted the special in live form, while Dr. Doofenshmirtz and Major Monogram appeared as animated.

Episodes

Reception

Critical response
The show has received generally positive reviews. The New York Times commented favorably, describing the show as "Family Guy with an espionage subplot and a big dose of magical realism." It considered the pop-culture references ubiquitous "but [placed] with such skill that it seems smart, not cheap." Whitney Matheson wrote in her USA Today blog Pop Candy that the series was an achievement in children's programming, applauding the writing and calling the show "an animated version of Parker Lewis Can't Lose." Emily Ashby of Common Sense Media praised the show's humor and plot, giving it four out of five stars. The Seattle Times wrote that the story of the show was "valiant" and that the main characters are "young heroes."

Variety noted the show's appeal to all ages with its "sense of wit and irreverence." Similar reviews have emphasized the series' popularity with adults; Rebecca Wright of Elastic Pops wrote, "As an adult, I really enjoyed watching this Phineas and Ferb DVD, and I think it is one that the whole family can enjoy." Wright also called the series' "irreverent style" reminiscent of The Adventures of Rocky and Bullwinkle. Wireds Matt Blum has stated in reviews of the series that he "can stand to watch just about anything with [his] kids, but [he] actually look[s] forward to watching Phineas and Ferb with them." Notable celebrities identified as fans of the series include Bob Eubanks, Anthony LaPaglia, Ben Stiller, Chaka Khan, Jeff Sullivan and Jake Gyllenhaal.

Among the negative reviews is one that charges the series with a lack of originality. Maxie Zeus of Toon Zone argues that the show is "derivative, but obviously so, and shorn of even the best features of what has been stolen." Zeus takes issue with the writing, feeling that certain jokes and conventions were "ripped-off" from other shows. Kevin McDonough of Sun Coast Today criticized the show for its plot complexity, constant action and "characters [that] can do just about anything." McDonough stated that "it's never clear whether P&F are intended to entertain children or are merely a reflection of grown-up animators engaged in a juvenile lark." Marylin Moss of The Hollywood Reporter described Phineas and Ferb as "Pretty mindless but kids of all ages might find a humorous moment in it." Moss called the plot lines redundant but praised the music styles and guest stars.

Alan Sepinwall and Matt Zoller Seitz gave a positive assessment in their 2016 book TV (The Book), stating that "In television, formula often seems to come from a lack of imagination. ... Phineas and Ferb though, managed at the same time to be wildly imaginative and slavishly formulaic, using its repetitive structure not as a crutch, but as a sturdy framework on which it could hang all kinds of fantastic new ideas." They further added that "the characters' awareness of that formula, and any deviations from it, quickly became one of the show's most fertile sources of humor."

Ratings
The first episode, "Rollercoaster", garnered a total of 10.8 million viewers when aired as a preview on August 17, 2007, holding onto more than half of the record-setting audience of its lead-in, High School Musical 2. When Phineas and Ferb officially debuted in February the next year, it proved to be cable's number-one watched animated series premiere by tweens. Throughout the quarter that followed, it peaked as the top-rated animated series for ages 6–10 and 9–14, also becoming the number-three animated series on cable television for viewers age 6–10. By the time the second season was announced in May 2008, the series had become a top-rated program in the 6–11 and 9–14 age groups.

The Disney Channel airing of "Phineas and Ferb Get Busted!" was watched by 3.7 million viewers. The episodes "Perry Lays an Egg" and "Gaming the System" achieved the most views by ages 6–11 and 9–14 of any channel in that night's time slot. This achievement made the series the number-one animated telecast that week for its target demographics. On June 7, 2009, Disney announced that the show had become the number-one primetime animated show for the 6–10 and 9–14 groups.

The premiere of "Phineas and Ferb Christmas Vacation" garnered 2.62 million viewers during its debut on Disney XD, the most watched telecast in the channel's history (including Toon Disney) and the number-three program of the night across all demographics. It received 5.2 million viewers for its debut on Disney Channel and was the highest-rated episode of the series to date and fifth-highest for the week.

The premiere of "Phineas and Ferb: Summer Belongs to You!" garnered 3.862 million viewers and was watched by 22% of children 2–11, 13% of teens, 5% of households and 3% of adults 18–49, also ranking as the number-one program for that night and as 25th for the week. On Disney XD, the episode ranked among the channel's top three telecasts of the year with 1.32 million viewers, including 365,000 among boys 6–11, with a 2.9 rating. The hour-long telecast on August 2, 2010, was the series' number-two telecast of all time on Disney XD in total viewers, behind only December 2009's "Phineas and Ferb Christmas Vacation".

Marketing and merchandise

Disney has licensed a number of products from the show, including plush toys of characters Perry, Ferb, Phineas and Candace. Disney released several T-shirts for the show and launched a "Make your own T-shirt" program on its website. Authors have novelized several episodes. Two Season 1 DVDs, entitled The Fast and the Phineas and The Daze of Summer, have been released; the discs include episodes never previously broadcast in the U.S. A third DVD was released on October 5, 2010, called A Very Perry Christmas. Some reviewers were displeased that the discs covered selected episodes rather than the entire series, but noted that Disney does not generally release full-season DVD sets.

In 2009, Disney licensed a Nintendo DS game titled Phineas and Ferb. The game's story follows the title characters as they try to build a roller coaster. The player controls Phineas, Ferb and occasionally Agent P (Perry the Platypus). Phineas scavenges for spare parts for the roller coaster while Ferb fixes various objects around town, gaining access to new areas as a result. Ferb can also construct new parts of the coaster and its vehicle-themed carts. Each activity features a short mini-game. The game was well-received and garners a 76.67% on GameRankings. A sequel entitled Phineas and Ferb: Ride Again was released on September 14, 2010. Another game, Phineas and Ferb: Across the Second Dimension, was released for the Wii and PlayStation 3 platforms in 2011.

In 2012, Disney opened an interactive game based on the series at Epcot, titled Agent P's World Showcase Adventure, which centered around Perry and Dr. Doofenshmirtz, based on the previous attraction Kim Possible World Showcase Adventure.

Also in 2012, Disney Mobile launched a mobile game titled Where's My Perry? for iOS and Android. It was based on Disney's popular Where's My Water? game, using similar physics.

In 2013, Disney commissioned Majesco Entertainment to create Phineas and Ferb: Quest for Cool Stuff, which was released for the Xbox 360, Wii U, Wii, Nintendo 3DS and Nintendo DS platforms.

Phineas and Agent P appear as playable characters in all the video games of the Disney Infinity series. As with the other playable characters in the games, tie-in figures for them were also released.

Homages
The U.K. Disney Channel produced a series entitled Oscar and Michael's Phineas and Ferb Fan Club Show in homage to the original series. The show features two boys who attempt to emulate Phineas and Ferb by taking part in adventures to alleviate boredom. The series aims to educating children and promote activity and creativity. It entered its second season on April 10, 2009. The television series Psych has made references to Phineas and Ferb in its sixth season. In the episode "Shawn Rescues Darth Vader", main character Shawn Spencer (portrayed by James Roday) states that he learned his British accent from the granddad on Phineas and Ferb (he tells this to guest star Malcolm McDowell, the voice of the granddad). In "The Amazing Psych Man & Tap-Man, Issue #2", Shawn mentions the series, stating: "I'm missing a Phineas and Ferb marathon. Perry the Platypus. He's a real platypus."

Awards and nominations

1. The Academy of Television Arts & Sciences announced that it would not present the award to either nominee in the category.
2. Shared with Back at the Barnyard.

Continuations

Television film

On March 3, 2010, a Disney press release announced a made-for-television film based on the series, entitled Phineas and Ferb the Movie: Across the 2nd Dimension, which aired on the Disney Channel on August 5, 2011. The film depicts Phineas and Ferb accidentally helping Dr. Doofenshmirtz with an invention that takes them to a parallel dimension, where Perry reveals his double life as a secret agent to them, and, to save their friends from a devious alternative Dr. Doofenshmirtz, they team up with their alternate-dimension selves to stop him.

Planned theatrical film
On January 11, 2011, Disney Channels Worldwide chief Gary Marsh announced that a theatrical Phineas and Ferb feature-length film was in development by Tron: Legacy producer Sean Bailey, to be produced by Mandeville Films. Series creators Povenmire and Marsh wrote a script, and the film was scheduled for release on July 26, 2013, by Walt Disney Pictures. Michael Arndt, who had written Little Miss Sunshine and Toy Story 3, was hired to write a draft of the screenplay. In October 2012, Disney moved the release date to 2014, and in August 2013, the film was removed from its schedule. This led to speculation that the project was canceled, but Marsh confirmed that the film was merely on hold. On July 12, 2015, it was confirmed that a form of the script of the film was completed. After years without further word on the film's development, in February 2018, it was revealed that the film might return to development depending on the success of the Milo Murphy's Law crossover special.  there have been no further updates on the development of the film.

Disney+ film

On April 11, 2019, it was announced that a film, titled Phineas and Ferb the Movie: Candace Against the Universe, would be released on Disney+ within a year of its launch; it would eventually premiere on August 28, 2020. Most of the series' cast reprised their roles, with the exception of Thomas Sangster as Ferb, who was replaced by David Errigo Jr., who had previously voiced Ferb on Milo Murphy's Law. According to writer Jim Bernstein, the film is unrelated to the theatrical Phineas and Ferb film in development. On August 20, 2020, Povenmire and Marsh stated that there had been talks for more film or television content in the future.

Revival
In January 2023, two new seasons of Phineas and Ferb consisting of 40 episodes were announced, with Povenmire returning. The deal also included a second season renewal for Povenmire's Hamster & Gretel. On March 16, 2023, it was announced that Marsh would also be returning as executive producer and voice director.

Crossovers

Phineas and Ferb: Mission Marvel

In 2012, it was announced that a crossover between Phineas and Ferb and Marvel Entertainment would air in the summer of 2013, titled Phineas and Ferb: Mission Marvel. It features Marvel Comics superheroes Iron Man, Spider-Man, the Hulk and Thor and the villains the Red Skull, Whiplash, Venom and M.O.D.O.K. It is the first major animated crossover between Marvel and Disney since the acquisition of Marvel Entertainment by Disney in 2009.

Phineas and Ferb: Star Wars

In July 2013, a crossover between Phineas and Ferb and Star Wars was announced, taking place as a sidebar to the events of Episode IV – A New Hope. The crossover episode aired on July 26, 2014.

Milo Murphy's Law

Povenmire has stated that he would like to do a crossover with his and Marsh's follow-up show, Milo Murphy's Law, which takes place in the same universe as Phineas and Ferb. The crossover eventually took place in Milo Murphy's Law's second season premiere, titled "The Phineas and Ferb Effect". The entire Phineas and Ferb cast reprised their roles for the episode, with the exception of Thomas Sangster, the original voice of Ferb, who was instead voiced by David Errigo, Jr. Before the crossover aired, Dr. Heinz Doofenshmirtz cameoed at the end of the episode "Fungus Among Us"; following the crossover, the characters Dr. Doofenshmirtz, Perry, Major Monogram and Carl joined the cast of Milo Murphy's Law in a recurring capacity.

Other media

Spin-offs

Disney produced a live-action talk show in which the two characters (as cartoons) interview celebrities, similarly to Space Ghost Coast to Coast, which began airing in December 2010 as a two-minute talk-show format featuring real-life celebrities such as Tony Hawk, Randy Jackson, Neil Patrick Harris, Seth Rogen, Taylor Swift, Andy Samberg, Tom Bergeron, Emma Roberts, Jack Black, Regis Philbin, Howie Mandel, David Beckham and Guy Fieri. The show concluded on November 25, 2011.

Doofenshmirtz's Daily Dirt was a weekly YouTube series starring Dr. Doofenshmirtz that premiered on January 3, 2013. In this miniseries, Doofenshmirtz talked about "current events, pop culture, music, the Internet, life and all things perplexing", according to its press release. The show concluded on February 27, 2014.

Live tour
Phineas and Ferb: The Best LIVE Tour Ever was a touring two-act adaptation of the TV show. A projection system played video in the same style as the TV show on the rear of the stage; the characters were first introduced there in their cartoon forms, but then used a backyard slide that continued into a physical slide, out of which the live cast members emerged into the real world. The performers wore prosthetics to make their characters resemble their cartoon counterparts—mostly head pieces, but a full body suit in the cases of Buford and Perry. The 2011–2012 season of the tour began on August 21, 2011, in Lakeland, Florida and ended on April 22, 2012, in East Rutherford, New Jersey. The 2012–2013 season began on August 23, 2012, in Wheeling, West Virginia and ran until February 18, 2013, in Chattanooga, Tennessee.

References

External links

 
 
 
 

 
2000s American animated television series
2000s American musical comedy television series
2000s American surreal comedy television series
2007 American television series debuts
2010s American animated television series
2010s American musical comedy television series
2010s American surreal comedy television series
2015 American television series endings
American children's animated comedy television series
American children's animated musical television series
Animated duos
Animated television series about brothers
Animated television series about children
Animated television series about families
Disney Channel original programming
Disney XD original programming
English-language television shows
Fictional duos
Metafictional television series
Television series about vacationing
Television series by Disney Television Animation
Television series by Rough Draft Studios
Television series created by Dan Povenmire and Jeff "Swampy" Marsh
Television shows set in the United States
American television series revived after cancellation